PMSG can stand for
 Pregnant mare's serum gonadotropin
 Permanent magnet synchronous generator, a kind of alternator.